Nazir Ahmed is a Pakistani politician who is the Deputy Speaker of the Gilgit Baltistan Assembly since November 2020. He has also been a member of the Gilgit Baltistan Assembly since November 2020.

Political career
Ahmed participated in the 2020 Gilgit-Baltistan Assembly election on 15 November 2020 from constituency GBA-20 (Ghizer-II) on the ticket of Pakistan Tehreek-e-Insaf. He won the election by a margin of 1,767 votes over the runner-up Khan Akbar Khan of the Pakistan Muslim League (N). He garnered 5,582 votes while Khan received 3,815 votes.

References

Living people
Gilgit-Baltistan MLAs 2020–2025
Politicians from Gilgit-Baltistan
Year of birth missing (living people)
People from Ghizer District